Shooting sports at the 1997 West Asian Games was held at the Azadi Sport Complex, Tehran, Iran. It had a men's only programme containing 14 events.

Medalists

Medal table

References

Official website

External links
Olympic Council of Asia - 1997 West Asian Games

West Asian Games
1997 West Asian Games
1997 West Asian Games
1997